"Wherever You Will Go" is the debut single of American band the Calling. The song was released on May 22, 2001, as the first single from their debut studio album, Camino Palmero (2001). It remains their most renowned and their most successful hit, peaking at number five on the Billboard Hot 100 and topping the Adult Top 40 for 23 weeks, the second-longest-running number one in the chart's history, behind "Smooth" by Santana and Rob Thomas. Outside the United States, the song experienced similar success, peaking atop the music charts of Italy, New Zealand, and Poland, reaching number three in the United Kingdom, number five in Australia, and becoming a top-ten hit in several European countries.

Background and writing
Songwriter Aaron Kamin talked about the song in a radio interview. He said, "At the time my grandmother's best friend had passed away and she left behind a husband of 50 or more years and I was at the funeral and afterwards I just started thinking of what it would be like to be him and have your whole life change so dramatically and not for the best in a matter of moments. Somebody that you live and grow with and are one with, just to be gone, is crazy and I figured all he ever thinks about probably is finding a way to get back to her or be with her or make sure she’s alright or something like that. That was the sentiment behind that.."

Music video
Two videos were shot for this song. The first was set in Mexico. The other version, which is more popular, was directed by Gregory Dark, and has the band performing in the concrete channel of the Los Angeles River, while a teenage soap opera plays in the foreground. A teenage girl gets her boyfriend's name tattooed on her shoulder, but when she finds him cheating with another girl, she flies into a rage, destroying most of his belongings. At the end of the video, she is seen with a new boyfriend (male model and then-fledgling actor Drew Fuller) with a flower tattoo covering the name, as her jealous ex watches her from his car. The group's lead singer, Alex Band, can also be seen in some scenes singing in the foreground of some of the storyline, such as when the girl is seen destroying the belongings.

Track listings

US 7-inch single
A. "Wherever You Will Go" – 3:28
B. "Adrienne" – 4:30

UK CD single
 "Wherever You Will Go" (radio edit) – 3:28
 "Lost" – 3:48
 "Wherever You Will Go" (acoustic) – 3:24
 "Wherever You Will Go" (director's cut video) – 3:26

UK cassette single
 "Wherever You Will Go" – 3:28
 "Lost" – 3:48
 "Wherever You Will Go" (acoustic) – 3:24

European CD single
 "Wherever You Will Go" (radio edit) – 3:28
 "Lost" – 3:48

European limited-edition maxi-CD single
 "Wherever You Will Go" – 3:28
 "Nothing's Changed" – 4:04
 "Lost" – 3:48
 "Wherever You Will Go" (video) – 3:26

Australian CD single
 "Wherever You Will Go" – 3:28
 "Nothing's Changed" – 4:04
 "Lost" – 3:48

Credits and personnel
Credits are adapted from the UK CD single liner notes.

Studios
 Recorded at Cherokee Studios (Hollywood, California)
 Mixed at Image Recording (Hollywood, California)

Personnel

 Alex Band – writing, vocals
 Aaron Kamin – writing, guitar, sitar, mandolin, loops, percussion
 Matt Laug – drums, percussion
 Bob Glaub – bass
 Ron Fair – synth strings
 Satnam Ramgotra – tabla, percussion
 Paul Mirkovich – additional keys

 Marc Tanner – production
 David Thoener – recording
 Marc Greene – recording
 Tiago Becker – recording assistant
 Valente Torres – recording assistant
 Chris Lord-Alge – mixing
 Matt Silva – mixing assistant

Charts

Weekly charts

Year-end charts

All-time charts

Certifications

Release history

Charlene Soraia version

The song was covered by English singer-songwriter Charlene Soraia for use in a Twinings advert in the United Kingdom. It was released in the UK as a digital download on September 30, 2011. On October 9, 2011, the song entered the UK Singles Chart at number 20 and peaked at number three two weeks later. It served as the lead single from Soraia's debut studio album, Moonchild (2011).

Music video
A music video for the song was uploaded to YouTube on October 3, 2011, at a total length of three minutes and thirty-eight seconds. The video shows Soraia in the studio performing the song.

Track listing
Digital download 
 "Wherever You Will Go" – 3:17
 "Lightyears" – 3:03

Charts

Weekly charts

Year-end charts

Certifications

Release history

In popular culture
The song was featured in the 2000 film Coyote Ugly in the scene where Violet first sees Kevin. The Calling performs the song live.

In 2001, the UPN network used the song to promote the debut of Star Trek: Enterprise.

The song was featured in the 2003 British comedy-drama film Love Actually during a scene in which Colin (Kris Marshall) participates in an orgy with a group of Wisconsinite girls shortly after arriving in the United States.

The song plays during the final scenes of the series finale of Saving Grace, a TNT drama that aired from 2007 to 2010.

The song plays on Smallville during the final scene of the episode "Metamorphosis" (Season 1 episode 2).

The song was parodied on Mad TV by several of the cast playing the Calling, Scott Stapp of Creed, Eddie Vedder of Pearl Jam, and Ray Charles, making fun of how all the singers' voices sound the same and they accuse each other of getting famous by imitating them.

This song is also featured in the popular Korean drama I'm Sorry, I Love You, starring So Ji-sub & Im Soo-jung and its soundtrack as well.

In Strike (TV series), Series 4: "Lethal White", Episode 1, it is the song that Robin Ellicot and Matthew Cunliffe use for the first dance at their wedding reception.

References

2000 songs
2001 debut singles
2011 debut singles
Bertelsmann Music Group singles
The Calling songs
Charlene Soraia songs
Number-one singles in Italy
Number-one singles in New Zealand
Number-one singles in Poland
Post-grunge songs
RCA Records singles
Songs about death
Songs written by Aaron Kamin
Songs written by Alex Band
UK Independent Singles Chart number-one singles
Music videos directed by Gregory Dark